is a Japanese actress, voice actress and gravure idol known by the nickname  in Japan.

Filmography

Anime 
7 of Seven as Nanarin
Dragonaut -The Resonance- as Saki Kurata
Gundam Reconguista in G as Raraiya Monday
Highschool of the Dead as Shizuka Marikawa
Kare Kano as Rika Sena
Kenkō Zenrakei Suieibu Umishō as Mirei Shizuoka
Kill la Kill as Sukuyo Mankanshoku
Mouse as Yayoi Kuribayashi
Macademi Wasshoi! as Falce The Variable Wand
Mushishi as Fuki
Petite Princess Yucie as Cocoloo
Re: Hamatora as Mio (Episode 1)
School Rumble as Sarah Adiemus
Strawberry Panic as Kagome Byakudan
Saint October as Natsuki Shirafuji
Tengen Toppa Gurren Lagann as Nia
Umi Monogatari: Anata ga Ite Kureta Koto as Warin

OVA
FLCL as Junko Miyaji
School Rumble OVA as Sarah Adiemus
Top o Nerae 2! as Nono
Air Gear as Kururu Sumeragi

Video games
Baldr Force EXE as Segawa Minori
Dissidia: Final Fantasy as Tina Branford
Dissidia 012 Final Fantasy as Tina Branford
Dissidia Final Fantasy NT as Tina Branford
Dissidia Final Fantasy Opera Omnia as Tina Branford, Oerba Dia Vanille
Final Fantasy Explorers as Tina Branford
Final Fantasy XIII as Oerba Dia Vanille
Final Fantasy XIII-2 as Oerba Dia Vanille
Lightning Returns: Final Fantasy XIII as Oerba Dia Vanille
God Eater (and its extended version God Eater Burst) as Shio
Luminous Arc 2: Will as Rina
Rune Factory 3 as Sia
True Tears as Gion Inoue
Tartaros Online as Nagi
Toukiden 2 as Benizuki
World of Final Fantasy as Tina Branford

Internet radio 
Diebuster Web Radio Top! Less (onsen（音泉）2005.10.4-　  reset date every Tuesday)
School Rumble nigakki weekend (onsen（音泉）2006．4.－　reset date every Friday）

Music
Anime Toonz Volume 4: Yukari Fukui

References

External links
 
Official website 
Seiyuu Info profile

1984 births
Living people
Japanese women pop singers
Japanese gravure models

Japanese video game actresses
Japanese voice actresses
People from Hiratsuka, Kanagawa
Voice actresses from Kanagawa Prefecture
20th-century Japanese actresses
20th-century Japanese women singers
20th-century Japanese singers
21st-century Japanese actresses
21st-century Japanese women singers
21st-century Japanese singers